The Last Queen is a book based on the life of Maharani Jind Kaur last queen of Punjab. It is written by Chitra Banerjee Divakaruni.

References

Indian historical novels in English
Novels set in India
Novels set in the 19th century
Novels by Chitra Banerjee Divakaruni
HarperCollins books